Elvira Gray-Jackson (born April 8, 1953) is an American politician who served as a Democratic member of the Alaska Senate for the G district. She previously served in the Anchorage Assembly from 2008 to 2017.

Career
Gray-Jackson won the general election on November 6, 2018. She secured sixty percent of the vote while her closest rival, Republican Jim Crawford, secured forty percent.

References

1953 births
20th-century African-American people
20th-century African-American women
21st-century African-American politicians
21st-century African-American women
21st-century American politicians
21st-century American women politicians
African-American city council members
African-American state legislators in Alaska
Democratic Party Alaska state senators
Anchorage Assembly members
Living people
Women city councillors in Alaska
Women state legislators in Alaska